The Men's +109 kg weightlifting competitions at the 2020 Summer Olympics in Tokyo took place on 4 August at the Tokyo International Forum.

Fernando Reis of Brazil was on the start list, but he was ejected from the Games after being suspended following a  positive drug test for human growth hormone. He was replaced by David Litvinov from Israel.

Records

Results

New records

References

Weightlifting at the 2020 Summer Olympics
Men's events at the 2020 Summer Olympics